The Dolomitenmann is an extreme sports relay race held in September in the East Tyrolean, or so-called Dolomite Mountains of Austria, near the city of Lienz. The founder and organiser is Werner Grissmann, a former World Cup skier.

The Dolomitenmann relay race has been run annually since 1988. In recent years the race has been sponsored by the manufacturers of Red Bull energy drink and is now known as Red Bull Dolomitenmann. The race is billed by its organizers as "the world's toughest team relay race".

The competition is only open to male athletes. Race organizer Werner Grissmann justifies this with the statement that he wishes to protect women, since the competition is only meant for the "hardest athletes", he does not want "to see women suffer" and that it would be "incompatible with their aesthetics". In 2017 for the first time there was a side competition that was also open to female athletes.

Disciplines 
  mountain running
  paragliding
  mountainbiking
  whitewater kayaking

Course 

When the runner makes the hand-off to the team's paraglider, he must also run, this time with his whole equipment to the first take-off point. After descending by air to Moosalm, the paraglider runs to a second take-off point, descending to Leisach where the mountain biker is ready and waiting.

After the climb, the mountain biker must ride a downhill track to the finish.

The teams kayaker swims across the river Drau where his boat is stationed. His first maneuver is an "alpine-start", or a drop off a  ramp into the river. After the jump the kayaker must navigate a difficult white water track on the river Isel before a last sprint back to the main square of Lienz.

Winning teams and tracks 

The fastest athlete of each discipline receives a trophy and the title Dolomitenmann. Until 2019 the trophies were designed by Jos Pirkner.

Dolomitenmen 

As of September 2020, there are 58 Dolomitenmen from 10 nations.

Top 10 Dolomitenmen (as of September 2021)

References

External links
Dolomitenmann official website

Endurance games
Red Bull sports events
Relay races
Sport in Tyrol (state)